Montecristo: Un Amor, Una Venganza (Monte Cristo: Love and Revenge) is an Argentine telenovela which premiered April 25, 2006 on Telefe. Loosely based on the 1844 Alexandre Dumas novel, The Count of Monte Cristo, Montecristo is Telefe's most popular novela and was called "the hottest telenovela in Argentina" by Variety in 2007.

Like Dumas' novel, the novela is a tale of revenge, with this version featuring "drug trafficking, kidnapping and military dictatorships." It was directed by Miguel Colom, and stars Pablo Echarri and Paola Krum.

International sales and remakes
More than 40 international markets bought the Telefe-produced series in 2006, and later Telefe sold it to Albania, Bulgaria, Israel, Macedonia, Serbia, the Philippines, and the Ukraine. In addition, Chile, Mexico, Portugal, Russia, and Colombia's Caracol TV produced adaptations, and in February 2007 Telefe sold remake rights to Italy and Spain as well.

Plot
The story begins in 1995 as Santiago Díaz Herrera is hurt while fencing with his best friend Marcos Lombardo. Marcos wants to bring Santiago back to Buenos Aires but his father, Alberto, commands him to leave Santiago in a Moroccan jail, and Santiago is declared dead. Eleven years pass, and in 2006 Santiago returns to Buenos Aires seeking revenge on the Lombardos for their crimes to himself, his father and other people who have stood in their way over the decades.

Cast
 Pablo Echarri as Santiago Díaz Herrera 
 Paola Krum as Laura Ledesma
 Joaquín Furriel as Marcos Lombardo 
 Viviana Saccone as Victoria Sáenz 
 Virginia Lago as Helena Luján 
 Roberto Carnaghi as Lisandro Donosso 
 Luis Machín as León Rocamora 
 Mónica Scapparone as Lola 
 Celina Font as Milena Salcedo
 Esteban Pérez as Luciano Mazello
 Maximiliano Ghione as Ramón Ortega 
 María Onetto as Leticia Monserrat  
 Horacio Roca as Padre Pedro
 Maria Abadi as Érica Donosso 
 Victoria Rauch as Valentina Lombardo

Other co-stars - Mario Pasik

References

External links
Montecristo - IntraTV.net

Golden Martín Fierro Award winners
2006 telenovelas
2006 Argentine television series debuts
2006 Argentine television series endings
Argentine telenovelas
Telefe telenovelas
Works about the Dirty War
Television shows based on The Count of Monte Cristo
Spanish-language telenovelas